Daniel Arsenault is an American photographer who specializes in photos of urban settings in Manhattan, New York City.  His most common technique is to take photographs with a film camera and then manipulate the images digitally to make them appear more "gritty."

Arsenault studied art and photography at the San Francisco Art Institute and received a BFA from the Art Center College of Design in Pasadena, California.

Exhibitions

Group
 The Edward Carter Gallery, Soho NYC (June–August 2001)
 Albers-Roesch Studio, “American Dream Swimming Pool”, Tribeca, New York (September 2002)
 The Viewing Room, Chelsea Art District, New York (October 2002)
 September 11 Memorial Exhibition, Ward - Nasse Gallery, New York (September 2003)
 Untitled group exhibition, Ward - Nasse Gallery, New York - January 2004 -

Personal
 The Ranch Rd. Fine Art Gallery, Salt Lake City (Spring 2000)
 The Denise Robarge Gallery, Palm Springs, California (April 2001)
 The Rio Grande Gallery, Salt Lake City, Utah (March 2002)
 The Jay Hawkins Gallery, Chelsea Art District, New York (July 2002)

References

American photographers
Year of birth missing (living people)
Living people